Multicellular tumor spheroids are scaffold-free spherical self-assembled aggregates of cancer cells. It is a 3 dimensional culture model which closely models oxygen gradients in small avascular tumors. They are cellular model used in cancer research to assess drug response.

References

Further reading
 
 
 
 
 

Extracellular matrix
Cancer research